The 2010 Wartburg Knights football team represented Wartburg College as a member of the Iowa Intercollegiate Athletic Conference (IIAC) during the 2010 NCAA Division III football season. Led by Rick Willis in his 12th season as head coach, the Knights began the season with high hopes to return to the top of the conference with a verteran team.  The Knights compiled an overall record of 10–1 with a mark of 8–0 in conference play, finishing atop the IIAC for the 12th time and completing their first undefeated regular season since 2003. They earned the conference's automatic bid to the NCAA Division III Football Championship playoffs, losing at home to the eventual national semifinalist  in the first round. During the season head coach Rick Willis earned his 100th career coaching victory with a win against . The team played home games at Walston-Hoover Stadium in Waverly, Iowa.

Schedule
Wartburg's 2010 regular season scheduled consisted of five home and five away games.

References

Wartburg
Wartburg Knights football seasons
Wartburg Knights football